Victor Wilhelm Lindauer (1888–1964) was  a New Zealand phycologist, collector and teacher.

The son of New Zealand painter Gottfried Lindauer, he was born in 1888 in Auckland, and grew up in Woodville, spending a considerable part of his boyhood in the native bush. He trained as a teacher and after two years service in WWI with the US Army, he returned to New Zealand.

In 1927 Lindauer married Elsie (née Lovell), and in 1931, after the births of four children, the family moved to Russell where he had been appointed headmaster of the primary school. In 1935, Josephine Tilden and a team of phycologists from the University of Minnesota came to Russell to collect seaweeds and enlisted his help to provide a place (the local school) to handle their material. They also invited him to participate, and thus began his lifelong quest to collect New Zealand seaweeds.  The school children whom he taught collected for him and with him. Other schoolmasters were also enlisted, not only on the North Island, but also R. Gilpin, a headmaster on the Chatham Islands. On Stewart Island, he contacted Eileen Willa, and she, too, became an avid collector.

Between 1939 and 1953 Lindauer created and distributed about 60 sets of the exsiccata work Algae Nova-Zelandicae Exsiccatae in 14 fascicles of 25 sheets. The sets have since been used as reference material for many taxonomic studies of New Zealand algae.

Selected publications

References

1888 births
1964 deaths
20th-century New Zealand botanists
Phycologists
Scientists from Auckland
People from Woodville, New Zealand